Alejandro Vázquez Sotorrío (born 16 March 1983) is a Spanish footballer who plays for UD Los Barrios as a left back.

Football career
Vázquez was born in Gijón, Asturias. After playing for every rank at local Sporting de Gijón's youth system, he could only amass three appearances for the first team in two seasons combined, both in the second division.

Vázquez then spent three additional years at lowly CD Linares, signing for 2008–09 with another second level club, Levante UD, and appearing very rarely in his sole campaign after which he was released, joining Alicante CF in Segunda División B. After spells in Alicante and AD Ceuta, Vázquez played for several clubs in Tercera División.

References

External links

1983 births
Living people
Footballers from Gijón
Spanish footballers
Association football defenders
Segunda División players
Segunda División B players
Tercera División players
Sporting de Gijón B players
Sporting de Gijón players
CD Linares players
Levante UD footballers
Alicante CF footballers
AD Ceuta footballers
Barakaldo CF footballers
Cultural Leonesa footballers
Arandina CF players
Lucena CF players
CD Torrevieja players
UD Los Barrios footballers
Real Avilés CF footballers
Europa F.C. players
Spanish expatriate footballers
Expatriate footballers in Gibraltar
Spanish expatriate sportspeople in Gibraltar